The Yugo-Vostochnaya Railway (Юго-Восточная железная дорога; "Southeastern Railway") is a subsidiary of the Russian Railways headquartered in Voronezh. Despite its name, the network operates the railways in the southwest of Russia. Its area of operation comprises Voronezh, Belgorod, Kursk, Ryazan, Tambov, Lipetsk, and Penza regions.

The railway network originated in the late 19th century as the Moscow-Ryazan Railway Association, a private enterprise set up by two Baltic Germans, Paul von Derwies and Karl Otto Georg von Meck. The first line opened in 1866; it connects Ryazan and Michurinsk. It was extended toward Voronezh, Tsaritsyn, Saratov, and Rostov-on-Don in 1871. The Balashov-Kharkov line was completed in 1890. After the Russian Revolution, the Southeastern Railways were nationalized by the Bolsheviks.

External links 
 

Railway lines in Russia
Railway lines opened in 1866
Rail transport in Voronezh Oblast
Rail transport in Belgorod Oblast
Rail transport in Tambov Oblast
Rail transport in Lipetsk Oblast
1866 establishments in the Russian Empire